The Rijeka–Šapjane−State border railway, officially designated the M203 railway is a  long, single-tracked railway line in Croatia, which is operated by HŽ Infrastruktura. M203 connects Rijeka to the Slovene railway network north of Šapjane and to the Zagreb via M202 east of Rijeka. It is electrified with 25 kV AC from Rijeka to Šapjane and 3 kV DC from Šapjane to the national border. Until 2014, it was classified as M502.

History
The route was opened in 1873.

Gallery

Maps

References

External links

Railway lines in Croatia
Transport in Primorje-Gorski Kotar County